Kathirinatham is a village in the Papanasam taluk of Thanjavur district, Tamil Nadu, India.

Demographics 

As per the 2001 census, Kathirinatham had a total population of 909 with 440 males and 469 females. The sex ratio was 1066. The literacy rate was 54.9.

References 

 

Villages in Thanjavur district